= Ethiopian Horticulture Producer Exporters Association =

Horticultural association based in Ethiopia

The Ethiopian Horticulture Producer Exporters Association is a horticultural association based in Ethiopia. Chaired by Tsegaye Abebe, it was established in 2002 to promote the export horticulture and floriculture sector in Ethiopia.

The association now has over 80 members and its management is carried out by a Board of five members elected by the General Assembly.
